Gorin is a rural locality (a khutor) in Sergiyevskoye Rural Settlement, Danilovsky District, Volgograd Oblast, Russia. The population was 110 as of 2010. There are 5 streets.

Geography 
Gorin is located in steppe, 3 km from the Medveditsa River, 33 km southwest of Danilovka (the district's administrative centre) by road. Sergiyevskaya is the nearest rural locality.

References 

Rural localities in Danilovsky District, Volgograd Oblast